Andhera Ujala (English: Darkness, Brightness) was a  popular Pakistani crime investigation television series aired on Pakistan Television (PTV) during the 1984–85 season, written by Younis Javed and directed by Rashid Dar.

It also had occasional touch of comic moments mainly centred upon the character of a police officer "Havaldar Karam Dad". The leading cast of the series included Irfan Khoosat, Jamil Fakhri, Qavi Khan and Abid Butt (Sub-Inspector). The main theme of this TV series was based on the 1983 drama Ragon mein Andhera that was to show a police team fighting crime in their locality in humorous situations. This TV drama serial later went on to become so popular among the public due to its re-runs that it became a 'cult classic'.

Cast

Main cast 
 Qavi Khan as DSP Tahir Ali Khan
 Rahat Kazmi as ASP Asad-Ur-Rehman
 Jamil Fakhri as (SHO) Inspector Jaffar Hussain
 Abid Butt as Sub Inspector Mehmood
 Nazir Hussani as ASI Mian Khan 
 Irfan Khoosat as Havaldar Karam Dad
 Sadia Jilani
 Yasmeen Ismail as Begum
 Manoon Abbasi as Constable Aftab
 Samina Ahmad 
 Afshan Qureshi as Jaffar Begum 
 Ismat Tahira

Recurring cast
 Mehboob Alam
 Aurangzeb Leghari
 Khayam Sarhadi
 Firdous Jamal as Arif
 Saba Hameed as Rubi
 Sehrish Khan as Saima
 Tahira Wasti
 Bindiya as Nasreen
 Asim Bukhari
 Nighat Butt
 Waseem Abbas
 Khursheed Shahid as Zainab
 Sarwat Ateeq as Muneer Begum
 Khalid Moin Butt appeared in multiple espisodes in villainous roles

Sequel

A sequel of Andhera Ujala was launched in 2019 with a new cast as well as the two old characters of Qavi Khan and Irfan Khoosat. The new members included Danish Taimoor,  Rashid Farooqi. Khawaja Saleem, Hamza Firdous, Ayaz Sammo and Irfan Motiwala.

References

External links 

Pakistan Television Corporation original programming
Pakistani drama television series
Pakistani comedy television series
Pakistani crime television series
Urdu-language television shows
1980s Pakistani television series